Tania, the Woman in Chains is a 1922 German silent drama film directed by Friedrich Zelnik and starring Lya Mara, Erich Kaiser-Titz, and Heinrich Peer.

The film's sets were designed by the art director Fritz Lederer.

Cast
Lya Mara as Tanja Fedorovna
Erich Kaiser-Titz
Heinrich Peer
Fritz Schulz
Maria Forescu
Erik Wirl
Harry Berber
Sophie Pagay
Paul Hansen

References

External links

Films of the Weimar Republic
Films directed by Frederic Zelnik
German silent feature films
German black-and-white films
German drama films
1922 drama films
Silent drama films
1920s German films
1920s German-language films